Sadd-e Kheyrabad (also Romanized as Sadd-e Kheyrābād; also known as Kheyrābād-e Do) is a village in Seyyed Abbas Rural District, Shavur District, Shush County, Khuzestan Province, Iran. At the 2006 census, its population was 44, in 7 families.

References 

Populated places in Shush County